"Let's Play House" is a song by hip hop duo Tha Dogg Pound featuring Michel'le. The song is the second single released from their debut album Dogg Food. Snoop Dogg, Nate Dogg and Michel'le make appearances in both the song and the video.  The song begins with a spoken intro from Dr. Dre.

Music video 
There are black and white clips of Michel'le and the Dogg Pound members playing cards, drinking, and smoking inside a club. Other scenes are in colour and show them at an outdoor party relaxing. The video was directed by Michael Martin. The music video was released for the week ending on October 27, 1995.

Original track
The song originally featured a very different intro, with different G-funk whistles, various drums in the background, different and more explicit lyrics, a brief verse from Warren G, different pitch in vocals, and an outro verse from Big Pimpin' Delemond that nearly doubled the runtime of the original track versus the final release. The original also does not feature Dr. Dre in the intro. The new track replaced Warren G's verse with one by Daz and Kurupt, and ditched the drums in the original for guitars. This original track never debuted for unknown reasons, but was resurfaced and made public in 2012 with the release of Tha Dogg Pound's compilation album Doggy Bag.

Charts

References

1995 singles
Tha Dogg Pound songs
G-funk songs
Dirty rap songs
1995 songs
Songs written by Daz Dillinger
Songs written by Kurupt
Songs written by Nate Dogg
Death Row Records singles
Michel'le songs